Kallø is a brand name used by Kallo Foods Limited, a British company that specialises in organic and natural foodstuffs. The firm has belonged since 2001 to  Ecotone (called Royal Wessanen until November 2020), a company headquartered in France with origins the Netherlands.

Products
The Kallø range of products includes
 puffed rice, corn and lentil cakes
 stock cubes
 gravy powder
 puffed rice

References

External links

Food manufacturers of the United Kingdom
Organic farming organizations